Vincent de Paul Kouadio "Alli" N'Dri (born 12 January 1984 in Bingerville) is an Ivorian footballer.

Career 
N'Dri began his career in the Académie de Sol Beni and was promoted to Côte d'Ivoire Premier Division champion ASEC Mimosas in January 2003, who was named as Team Captain. N'Dri was one of ASEC’s experienced first choice defenders and played almost all his club's games. He left after six years first team football and signed with Russian club, FC Shinnik Yaroslavl in January 2009.

Attributes 
He is very disciplined, a good ball winner and good communicator in the defence, N'Dri is also a regular goal scorer.

International 
On 28 May 2007 was his first call up for Ivory Coast an African Cup of Nations Qualifications game against Madagascar.

Career statistics

Honours

Club
ASEC Mimosas
Côte d'Ivoire Premier Division (4): 2003, 2004, 2005, 2006
Coupe de Côte d'Ivoire de football (4): 2003, 2005, 2007, 2008
Coupe Houphouët-Boigny (4): 2004, 2006, 2007, 2008

References

External links
 Profile at the official FC Volga Nizhny Novgorod website
 Profile at the official FC Shinnik Yaroslavl website

1984 births
Living people
Ivorian footballers
ASEC Mimosas players
Expatriate footballers in Russia
Association football defenders
FC Shinnik Yaroslavl players
Ivorian expatriate footballers
FC Volga Nizhny Novgorod players
People from Bingerville